Éva Kiss (born 20 March 1954) is a Hungarian former swimmer. She competed in three events at the 1972 Summer Olympics.

References

External links
 

1954 births
Living people
Hungarian female swimmers
Olympic swimmers of Hungary
Swimmers at the 1972 Summer Olympics
People from Gödöllő
Sportspeople from Pest County